Saul Elkins (June 29, 1907 in New York, New York – May 9, 2001 in Henderson, Nevada) was an American writer, producer and director in the film industry. 

Saul was the eldest of three sons of East European Jewish immigrant tailors. He was the brother of BBC, Newsweek and CBS journalist/broadcaster Michael Elkins. He directed 11 short films between 1944 and 1949, produced 14 movies between 1948 and 1951 and wrote the screenplay for 24 films between 1936 and 1950.

Filmography

References

External links 
 
 Saul Elkins filmography with synopsis at TCM (Turner Classic Movies)

American film producers
American directors
1907 births
2001 deaths